Terry Wilkins is an Australian-born Canadian musician, composer and producer.

Career
A native of Sydney, Australia, Terry's early performances saw him playing guitar in a folk group at University in 1965 (following his graduation from Parramatta Marist High in 1964). 
Within a couple of years he had dropped out of Academia and found himself in Taylor Square, Darlinghurst.
The Taylor Square scene was a breeding ground in the late 60s.
Various bands playing jug band, blues, psychedelic, folk, country and other styles co-existed there for a few years.

Terry discovered the bass at this time playing with The Starving Wild Dogs featuring New Zealander Red McKelvie on guitar, Daryl McKenzie on drums and Wally Mudd singing and playing harmonica.
The Starving Wild Dogs loom large in the mythology of that Taylor Square scene.

By 1969, they had evolved into The Quill which was a little more focused on original material. They supported country rock band The Flying Circus in September 69 at a time when that band had just lost their bass player.

Terry was invited to join Flying Circus and gave them extra muscle with songwriting and vocal harmonies. Red McKelvie was also recruited to Flying Circus soon after, making them one of Australia's most polished stage bands. They produced beautiful albums like "Prepared In Peace".

In 1970, they won the Battle of the Sounds which for years had become an established launch pad for Australian bands like The Masters Apprentices to travel overseas. P & O ocean liners offered the winners a trip to the UK or the USA.

The Flying Circus were trying to break into the American scene, based in San Francisco, but gigs were hard to find.
A connection with Toronto band McKenna Mendelson Mainline (who they had met in Australia) steered the Flying Circus north and they fitted in there very well.

Terry has remained in Toronto since 1971, and since then has worked with many Canadian and international artists from Lighthouse to Big Sugar as well as Rough Trade and David Wilcox. He has also backed many visiting artists such as Dr. John, Eddie Cleanhead Vinson, Maria Muldaur, John Hammond, Levon Helm and Son Seals. His musical range is wide and varied with an emphasis on roots music especially blues and swing with some interesting adventures in Caribbean styles.

References

Living people
Year of birth missing (living people)
Australian rock bass guitarists
Lighthouse (band) members
Rough Trade (band) members